Parliamentary elections were announced in Greece on 1 August 1859. The elections took place in September and the first days of October. Supporters of Athanasios Miaoulis won a majority of the 139 seats. Miaoulis remained Prime Minister. The Sixth Parliamentary session was announced on 7 October and convened on 28 October. There were extensive reports of inappropriate interference by government and state officials.

Results

References

Greece
Parliamentary elections in Greece
1859 in Greece
Greece
1850s in Greek politics